Allison Randal is a software developer and author.  She was the chief architect of the Parrot virtual machine, a member of the board of directors for The Perl Foundation, a director of the Python Software Foundation from 2010 to 2012, and the chairman of the Parrot Foundation.  She is also the lead developer of Punie, the port of Perl 1 to Parrot. She is co-author of Perl 6 and Parrot Essentials and the Synopses of Perl 6.  She was employed by O'Reilly Media. From August 2010 till February 2012, Randal was the Technical Architect of Ubuntu at Canonical.

In 2009, Randal was chair of O'Reilly's Open Source Convention (OSCON). She was elected a fellow of the Python Software Foundation in 2010.

She is currently a director of the Open Source Initiative and was its president between 2015 and 2017, taking over from and handing back to Simon Phipps. She also serves on the OpenStack Foundation board of directors.

References

External links 

 "here be unicorns", Allison Randal's blog
 An Interview with Allison Randal by Simon Cozens of perl.com
 Interview with Allison Randal by The Perl Review
 The Perl Programming Language

Year of birth missing (living people)
Living people
Perl people
Perl writers
O'Reilly writers
American women computer scientists
American computer scientists
Members of the Open Source Initiative board of directors
Python (programming language) people
Open source advocates
21st-century American women